Alexie Alaïs (born 9 October 1994 in Kourou) is a French athlete specialising in the javelin throw. She finished sixth at the 2018 European Championships.

Her personal best in the event is 63.46 metres set in Bydgoszcz in 2019.

International competitions

References

1994 births
Living people
French female javelin throwers
People from Kourou
French people of French Guianan descent
French Athletics Championships winners
World Athletics Championships athletes for France
20th-century French women
21st-century French women